A Christmas store is a retail store specializing in Christmas supplies, especially decorations. Many Christmas stores operate only seasonally in the month or two before the Christmas holidays, perhaps set up in otherwise vacant shopping mall space. However, in some places, Christmas stores operate year-round, becoming somewhat of a tourist attraction in their own right.

Examples of items that feature prominently in Christmas stores include nutcrackers, angel figures, and holiday-related stuffed animals.

See also
Economics of Christmas
Pop-up retail

References

Store